Franz Fischer may refer to:-
  (1849–1918), cellist and Hofkapellmeister in München
 Franz Joseph Emil Fischer (1877–1947), chemist, famous for Fischer-Tropsch process
 , (1901–1989), Sturmscharführer
  (1902–1960), chemist, famous for his works on structural analysis of phytol and other natural organic compounds

 SS Franz Fischer, a British-built collier

See also
 Franciszek Fiszer (or Franc Fiszer, 1860–1937), Polish bon-vivant and philosopher
 Franz Fischler (born 1946), Austrian politician